Nyaa or NYAA may refer to:

nyā, a transliteration of the Japanese onomatopoeia for a cat's meow
Nyaa Torrents, a BitTorrent website 
New York Academy of Art
Nyaa, a fictional cat character in Kodomo no Jikan
Nyaa-tan, a fictional cat from Etotama

See also
Nya (disambiguation)